Haplochromis welcommei is a threatened species of cichlid endemic to Lake Victoria in Africa.  This species reaches a length of  SL. Although further surveys are needed to confirm its status, it is considered possibly extinct by the IUCN on the basis that there have been no definite records since 1985.

It is the only scale-eating cichlid in the Lake Victoria system.

The specific name honours Robin Welcomme, who was a fisheries biologist at the East African Freshwater Fisheries Research Organisation and who collected the type of this species.

References

welcommei
Fish of Lake Victoria
Taxa named by Humphry Greenwood
Fish described in 1966
Taxonomy articles created by Polbot